Paycom Software, Inc., known simply as Paycom, is an American online payroll and human resource technology provider based in Oklahoma City, Oklahoma with offices throughout the United States. It is attributed with being one of the first fully online payroll providers. It has been recognized by Fortune and Forbes as one of the fastest-growing publicly traded companies in the world, and as one of the World's Most Innovative Enterprise Companies by Fast Company in 2022. Founded in 1998, it reported annual revenue of $1.375 billion for 2022, up from $1.06 billion for 2021.

History 
Paycom was founded in 1998 by Chad Richison, who previously worked in the payroll processing industry. It began as an online payroll service provider for businesses, and expanded to offer additional services including human resource management in 2001. On April 15, 2014, Paycom opened for trade on the New York Stock Exchange under the ticker symbol PAYC.

In 2011, Paycom moved its headquarters to a new 90,000 square foot office building, remaining in Oklahoma City. The same year it released additional services including E-Verify, onboarding, expense management, and document storage. In 2014, Paycom built a 90,000-square-foot addition to its headquarters—effectively doubling the size of its offices. The company completed construction on its third and fourth buildings (in 2016 and 2018, respectively), bringing the total square-footage of its corporate campus to 500,000. In May 2022, Paycom held a grand opening ceremony for a new 150,000 square-foot operations center in Grapevine, Texas.

CEO Chad Richison was the highest paid executive in the United States in 2020, earning $211.13 million from Paycom as part of a 10-year performance contract. The compensation consists mostly of stock shares that only vest if the company reaches specific stock price benchmarks by 2026 and 2030.

In July 2021, Paycom announced the release of Beti, an enhancement to its payroll system allowing employees to complete their own payroll. Later that year, they bought the naming rights to the Paycom Center, home of the Oklahoma City Thunder after Chesapeake Energy filed for chapter 11 bankruptcy.

Awards and recognition 
Paycom received the Service Bureau of the Year Award in 2013, and was also named to the Metro 50 List of Oklahoma companies with the largest growth from the previous two years. Paycom has been named a top workplace in Oklahoma by The Oklahoman for nine consecutive years, including No. 1 in 2016. Paycom also made Deloitte's Technology Fast 500 list in 2015 and 2016.

In 2010, it received a Stevie Award for Sales Department of the Year in the Financial Services category, following up with another in 2011 for Best Sales Training Manager of the Year. Inc. recognized Paycom as a Top 100 Job Creator in 2012 and 2013, and as one of the Fastest-Growing Private Companies for the years 2006 - 2014. In 2014, Paycom was named to the inaugural Build 100, which recognizes less than 1.5 percent of U.S.-based companies that are noted as sustained-growth champions.

Paycom ranked No. 28 among large businesses on Glassdoor's 2015 Best Places to Work in the U.S. list. In 2013, Glassdoor named Paycom one of the Top Five Best Places to Work in the U.S. and recognized Paycom again in 2014 as one of the Best Places to Work. Paycom also ranked on Glassdoor's Top 25 Most Difficult Companies To Interview list. The same year it received the EPCOR David DeMarea Payments Innovation Award. In 2020 and 2021, they were ranked on Top Workplace USA's list of organizations with over 2,500 employees.

Paycom won HR.com's Leadership 500 Excellence Awards in 2014 and 2015. Paycom earned its place in the midsize company rankings based on its outstanding achievements in leadership development and programs.

Paycom was named one of the Wall Street Journal’s Best Managed Companies in 2019, In 2021, they were named one of the Best Companies for Women to work in the United States by Comparably.

Paycom was added to the S&P 500 in January 2019, and was listed sixth on Fortune’s 2019 100 Fastest-Growing Companies List. The list is a ranking of the world’s top three-year performers in revenues, profits, and stock returns.

References

External links 
 

Business services companies established in 1998
Financial services companies established in 1998
Companies based in Oklahoma City
Companies listed on the New York Stock Exchange
2014 initial public offerings